The Mazda R360 is a kei car manufactured and marketed by Mazda as the company's first passenger car — a two-door, four-seat coupé. The suspension, front and rear, was rubber "springs" and torsion bars.

Within a few years of introducing the R360, Mazda had captured much of the lightweight (kei car) market in Japan. The R360 was augmented by the Mazda P360 "Carol" two-door and four-door sedan in 1962. Production of the R360 lasted for six years.

Specification 
There were two variants of the Mazda R360, officially known as KRBB and KRBC. Both variants were very similar visually, however the first generation, KRBB came with a 4-speed manual transmission, whereas the second generation KRBC came with a 2-speed "TORQ DRIVE" automatic transmission.

Mazda R360 Performance

Engine

Interior and exterior colours

Interior 
The standard Mazda R360 came in 3 different exterior whole-body colours; Opal Gren, Maroon Rouge and Somerset Blue. 

The non-standard Deluxe Mazda R360 came in multi colour variants; Blue and Cream and Red and Cream.

Exterior 
For the interior of the Mazda R360, the official colour choices were Red or Blue. These colour options were available for the seats, carpet and inner door panels.

B360 Pickup

The B360 was a pickup truck bodystyle based on parts of the R360 Coupé. It used the same 356 cc engine, but in a front-engine, rear-wheel-drive layout.  Like most pickups, it used a rigid rear axle and leaf spring suspension. The engine was replaced with the Carol's 358 cc I4 in 1964, and the B360 was replaced by the Mazda E360 in 1967.

A larger B600 pickup was introduced for the export market. It used a 577 cc version of the Mazda V-twin.

References

External links

R360
Microcars
Kei cars
Rear-wheel-drive vehicles
Cars powered by 2-cylinder engines
Cars introduced in 1960
Rear-engined vehicles